Richmond Lowlands is a town of Sydney, in the state of New South Wales, Australia. It is located in the City of Hawkesbury south-west of Freemans Reach.

There is a history of cattle breeding with previous occupants including Moxie's dairy. There are also many turf farms in the area.

References

Suburbs of Sydney
City of Hawkesbury